The Foundation for the Promotion of European Education F.I.N.E. - University of Wales, Romania, a university located in Bucharest, Romania, was established in 2001 and received authorisation to function from the Romanian Ministry of Education, Research and Youth in 2003. Classes are taught during the day and 3-year degrees in Management and Marketing are awarded.

External links
 Official site

Universities in Bucharest
Educational institutions established in 2001
Romania
2001 establishments in Romania